The Battle of Fatagar (alternatively known as Nech Sar) was a reprisal war between the participants of the previous Adal Sultanate and Ethiopian Empire in the Ethiopian-Adal war. It was fought between the forces of the Sultanate of Harar led by Nur ibn Mujahid, and the Ethiopian Empire under Emperor Gelawdewos. The Ethiopian Emperor was killed by Adal forces in this battle.

Battle
In 1559, Nur invaded Fatagar to confront Gelawdewos with the Malassay comprising eighteen hundred horsemen, five hundred riflemen, numerous sword and bow-wielding troops. The Abyssinian forces were greatly outnumbered as Gelawdewos had sent an army to lay siege to Harar. However, the explorer Richard Francis Burton tells a slightly different account, adding that Gelawdewos had been supervising the restoration of Debre Werq when he received a message from Emir Nur challenging him to combat. When the Emperor met the Emir, a priest warned that the angel Gabriel had told him Gelawdewos would needlessly risk his life—which caused most of the Ethiopian army to flee. According to Harari chronicle, Early in the battle Galawdéwos was shot, but continued struggling until encircled by numerous Harari cavalry, which gave him a death blow.

References

Fatagar
Fatagar